Anthias is a genus of colourful fishes in the subfamily Anthiadinae. Most species are found at deep reefs in the tropical and subtropical Atlantic, often well below depths reachable to a scuba diver. A single species, A. noeli, is found at deep reefs in the East Pacific.

They are red, pink, orange, or yellow, and the largest species reach  in length. They typically occur in groups that feed on zooplankton.

Species
In the past, this genus included far more species, but these have now been moved to other genera, for example Callanthias, Odontanthias, and Pseudanthias. Based on FishBase, these species are currently included in Anthias:

 Anthias anthias (Linnaeus, 1758) swallowtail sea perch
 Anthias asperilinguis Günther, 1859 jeweled gemfish
 Anthias cyprinoides (Katayama & Amaoka, 1986) Pagalu swallowtail
 Anthias helenensis Katayama & Amaoka, 1986 Saint Helena swallowtail
 Anthias menezesi Anderson & Heemstra, 1980 Brazilian swallowtail
 Anthias nicholsi Firth, 1933 yellowfin bass
 Anthias noeli Anderson & Baldwin, 2000 rosy jewelfish
 Anthias woodsi Anderson & Heemstra, 1980 swallowtail bass

References

Anthiinae
Taxa named by Marcus Elieser Bloch